An aquanaut is any person who remains underwater, breathing at the ambient pressure for long enough for the concentration of the inert components of the breathing gas dissolved in the body tissues to reach equilibrium, in a state known as saturation. Usually this is done in an underwater habitat on the seafloor for a period equal to or greater than 24 continuous hours without returning to the surface. The term is often restricted to scientists and academics, though there were a group of military aquanauts during the SEALAB program. Commercial divers in similar circumstances are referred to as saturation divers. An aquanaut is distinct from a submariner, in that a submariner is confined to a moving underwater vehicle such as a submarine that holds the water pressure out. Aquanaut derives from the Latin word aqua ("water") plus the Greek nautes ("sailor"), by analogy to the similar construction "astronaut".

Military aquanauts include Robert Sheats, author Robin Cook, and astronauts Scott Carpenter and Alan Shepard. Civilian aquanaut Berry L. Cannon died of carbon dioxide poisoning during the U.S. Navy's SEALAB III project.
Scientific aquanauts include Sylvia Earle, Jonathan Helfgott, Joseph B. MacInnis, Dick Rutkowski, Phil Nuytten,  and about 700 others, including the crew members (many of them astronauts) of NASA's NEEMO missions at the Aquarius underwater laboratory.

Russian military program
A unit of the Russian navy has developed an aquanaut program that has deployed divers more than 300 meters deep. An ocean vessel has been developed and is based in Vladivostok that is specialized for submarine and other deep sea rescue and that is equipped with a diving complex and a 120-seat deep sea diving craft.

Accidental aquanaut

Eleven crew members died, but in total darkness, Okene felt his way into the engineer's office  in height that contained air sufficient to keep him alive. There, he fabricated a platform from a mattress and other materials which kept the upper part of his body above water that helped reduce heat loss.

Three days after the accident, Okene was discovered by South African divers, Nicolaas van Heerden, Darryl Oosthuizen and Andre Erasmus, employed to investigate the scene and recover the bodies. The rescuing divers fitted Okene with a diving helmet so he could breathe while being transferred into a closed diving bell and returned to the surface for decompression from saturation. Okene lost consciousness during the transfer.

See also

Astronaut

Notes

References

External links
 Arctic IV (1975), documentary about Joseph MacInnis' Arctic dive
 Information article from Tass about Soviet aquanautic program